Calvin David "Cal" Bricker (3 November 1884 – 24 April 1963) was a Canadian track and field athlete. He competed in the long jump and triple jump at the 1908 and 1912 Olympics and won a bronze and a silver medal in the long jump, respectively. At the 1908 Olympic trials he set a national record in the long jump that stood for 27 years.

Bricker graduated from the University of Toronto in 1907 with a degree in dentistry. He served in World War I as a dentist and helped organize the 1919 Inter-Allied Games in Paris. He spent most of his later years practicing dentistry in Grenfell. He was inducted into Canada's (1956), the Saskatchewan (1966), and the University of Toronto (1996) Sports Halls of Fame. The Cal D. Bricker Memorial Trophy is given annually to the Canada's best long jumper.

References

External links 
 

Canadian male long jumpers
Olympic silver medalists for Canada
Olympic bronze medalists for Canada
Athletes (track and field) at the 1908 Summer Olympics
Athletes (track and field) at the 1912 Summer Olympics
Olympic track and field athletes of Canada
1884 births
1963 deaths
Track and field athletes from Ontario
Medalists at the 1908 Summer Olympics
Medalists at the 1912 Summer Olympics
University of Toronto alumni
Olympic silver medalists in athletics (track and field)
Olympic bronze medalists in athletics (track and field)